Martin Kasálek (born 8 September 1980) is a Czech football player who played in the Gambrinus liga for Hradec Králové.

He has played for the Czech Republic national futsal team.

References

External links
 
 

1980 births
Living people
Czech footballers
AS Trenčín players
Czech First League players
FC Hradec Králové players
FC Zbrojovka Brno players
Association football forwards
Footballers from Brno